This is a list of episodes from the 1998 Japanese anime television series Generator Gawl.

In October 2007, Professor Takuma Nekasa uncovers a gene code that will unlock our body's greatest mystery and expose mankind to its greatest threat. So Gawl, Koji, and Ryo - three young scientists from the future - must travel back in time to correct this mistake from the past. The catch? They have only three months to save the world from the mysterious and cunning Ryuko Saito and her Generators, unearthly assassins posing as humans. As Ryo and Koji try to complete their mission, Gawl must become like his enemies to fight on their terms. And it may cost him his humanity.

Episode list

References

Generator Gawl